Siri Minken (born 4 February 1980 in Oslo, Norway), is a former Norwegian women's International motorcycle trials rider. Minken was Norwegian Women's Trials Champion in 2001 and also a member of the Norwegian Women's Team which won the 2001 Trial des Nations event.

Biography
In 1999 Minken competed in the newly formed FIM European Women's Championship which consisted of one round held that year in Italy. She finished in 8th position.

Minken returned in 2000 to ride the European series once more, now riding a Gas Gas. The series had now expanded to three rounds held in Germany, Italy and concluding in her homeland of Norway. After a best ride of 5th in Germany and good placings at the other rounds she ended the season in 6th place. She also contested the FIM World Women's Trials Championship, a single round affair held in Spain, finishing 11th.

2001 was to be a bounty year for Minken. She clinched the Norwegian Trials Championship and headed off to European in search of more glory. In the European championship a 5th in Spain and an 8th in Italy was enough for a 6th-place finish in the championship. The FIM World round in Italy brought her an 8th-place finish, three steps higher than the previous season. Minken also left Europe and ventured over to the United States to compete in the NATC Trials Championship. Although only competing in 4 of the 10 rounds she placed 2nd in Rhode Island day one, then won on day two, then took a double victory in New York, giving her 3rd place in the American National Series behind the Canadian duo of Christy Williams and Kerry Williams. The icing on the cake was still to come. Minken joined her Norwegian Trial des Nations teammates Linda Meyer and Kjersty Fla in France and they took a historic win ahead of a strong Spanish team, claiming the 2001 FIM Women's TDN title.  

The pace slowed a little for Minken in 2002, taking 8th place in the Norwegian Women's series.

In 2003 she was runner-up in the Norwegian championship, which now had a new one round format instead of a multi-round series. In European Minken finished 7th in France and did not contest the following rounds leaving her 15th in the championship.

Minken contested the full European Women's championship in 2004, finishing 14th in France, 7th in Britain and 7th again in Spain, enough for a top ten finish in the title race. She also finished 5th and 12th in the two round FIM World Women's championship held in Spain to end the season 6th overall.

Minken can now be found working as a sports psychologist with FIM Europe, and she is still involved with trials training schools helping bring through the next generation of stars.

National Trials Championship Career

International Trials Championship Career

Honors
 Norwegian Women's Trials Champion 2001
 FIM Trial des Nations Women's Trials Champion team member 2001

Related Reading
NATC Trials Championship
FIM Trial European Championship
FIM Trial World Championship
Trial des Nations

References 

1980 births
Living people
Norwegian motorcycle racers
Motorcycle trials riders
Sportspeople from Oslo